The 1981 Australian Rally Championship was a series of rallying events held across Australia. It was the 14th season in the history of the competition.

Geoff Portman and navigator Ross Runnalls in the Datsun Stanza won the 1981 Championship.

Season review

The 1981 season saw the Datsun Stanzas dominate the competition once more, taking out first, second and third places in the championship. It was the sixth championship for Datsun in seven years, with wins in all five rounds. The Nissan Rally Team were the only "works" supported team competing in the championship following the withdrawal of the Ford Rally and Holden Dealer teams at the end of the 1980 season. This was the final season for the Nissan Rally Team when Nissan transferred their interest to circuit racing with the turbo charged Nissan Bluebird.

The Rallies

The five events of the 1981 season were as follows.

Round One – Commonwealth Bank Rally of the West

Round Two – Lutwyche Village Rally

Round Three – Bega Valley Rally

Round Four – Akademos Rally

Round Five – Alpine Rally

1981 Drivers and Navigators Championships
Final pointscore for 1981 is as follows.

Geoff Portman – Champion Driver 1981

Ross Runnalls – Champion Navigator 1981

References

External links

Rally Championship
Rally competitions in Australia
1981 in rallying